WFEL-LP is a Full Service formatted broadcast radio station licensed to and serving Antioch, Illinois.  WFEL-LP is owned and operated by Faith Evangelical Lutheran Church.

Programming
The station plays a mix of informational, religious, and entertainment programs along with a healthy dose of music from all genres, all family friendly in nature.

WFEL broadcasts two live shows during the weekdays.  America's Gold Top 40 and Modern Mix are aired in the afternoons and evenings respectively.  These shows are broadcast from the studios of WFEL.

WFEL plays a wide variety of Old-time radio programs each evening such as Fibber McGee and Molly, The Great Gildersleeve, Gunsmoke, The Lone Ranger, Casey, Crime Photographer, and The Whistler.

WFEL also broadcasts services, sermons and devotions of Faith Evangelical Lutheran Church live to the Antioch area.

External links
 Faith 99 Online
 

FEL-LP
Radio stations established in 2003
Full service radio stations in the United States